Pleioblastus fortunei is a species of bamboo in the family Poaceae. It is native to central and southern Japan, and has been introduced to southeast China, the North and South Islands of New Zealand, Maryland, Virginia, and the District of Columbia in the United States, Columbia, and southeast Brazil. It is an invasive species, escaping from cultivation and difficult to control, even surviving mowing. As its synonym Pleioblastus variegatus, dwarf white-striped bamboo, a variegated morph, has gained the Royal Horticultural Society's Award of Garden Merit.

References

Bambusoideae
Endemic flora of Japan
Plants described in 1933